Hannah Moscovitch (born June 5, 1978) is a Canadian playwright who rose to national prominence in the 2000s. She is best known for her plays East of Berlin, This Is War, "Old Stock: A Refugee Love Story", and Sexual Misconduct of the Middle Classes, for which she received the 2021 Governor General's Award for English-language drama.

Life and career
Today based in Toronto and Halifax, she was born in Ottawa. Her father, Allan Moscovitch, is a social policy professor at Carleton University. Her mother, Julie White, is a labour researcher. Both have long been active in left wing politics. Moscovitch's father is Jewish, of Romanian and Ukrainian background, while her mother is from a Christian background (of English and Irish ancestry). Moscovitch was "raised as an atheist", and has said that there is "implicitly Jewish sensibility" to her plays. She studied at the National Theatre School in the acting stream.

Moscovitch gained considerable notice for two short plays written for Toronto's SummerWorks. In 2005 she presented Essay, a play about gender politics in modern academia. The next year at the festival The Russian Play premiered, a romance set in Stalinist Russia. Both were well received by critics and audiences. In 2007 her first full-length play, East of Berlin, premiered at the Tarragon Theatre. The play focuses on the legacy of the Holocaust on the children of those involved. The main character is the son of a Nazi war criminal who grows up in Paraguay. He eventually travels to Berlin and meets the daughter of an Auschwitz survivor. The play was acclaimed for its complex subject, humour, and characters and was also a popular success, returning to Tarragon in winter 2009 and 2010.

2013 saw the premiere of This Is War, a play depicting the lives of Canadian troops in Afghanistan. This Is War won multiple awards with one reviewer writing "Moscovitch shines a light on massive issues like sexual harassment within the military without making her play a morality tale or exposé. It’s a story about four good people in a bad place and all the gray area that that produces." In 2015, Moscovitch wrote the play Infinity about a physicist who becomes involved in a love story while contemplating the nature of time. She collaborated with Lee Smolin to lend verisimilitude to some of the theoretical ideas.

Moscovitch's plays have been widely produced across Canada, including at the Magnetic North Theatre Festival, Ottawa's Great Canadian Theatre Company, The National Arts Centre, Toronto's Factory Theatre, Edmonton's Theatre Network, the Manitoba Theatre Centre, Vancouver's Firehall Arts Centre, and the Alberta Theatre Projects. Moscovitch is currently playwright-in-residence at Tarragon Theatre and was previously a contributing writer to the CBC radio drama series Afghanada (2006-2011).

She has been dubbed "an indie sensation" by Toronto Life Magazine; "the wunderkind of Canadian theatre" by CBC Radio; "irritatingly talented" by the now defunct Eye Weekly; and the "dark angel of Toronto theatre" by Toronto Star. The National Post, The Globe and Mail, and Now Magazine have all hailed Moscovitch as "Canada's Hottest Young Playwright".

In 2021, Moscovitch and Jennifer Podemski created the drama series Little Bird for Crave.

Works
 Essay – 2005
 The Russian Play – 2006
 East of Berlin – 2007
 In This World – 2008
 The Children's Republic – 2009
 Little One – 2011
 Other People's Children – 2012
 This Is War – 2012
 I Have no Stories to Tell You – 2013
 Infinity – 2014
 What a Young Wife Ought To Know – 2015
The Kaufman Cabaret - 2016 - Commissioned by the University of Alberta 
 Bunny – 2016
 Old Stock: A Refugee Love Story - 2017
 Secret Life of a Mother - 2018
 Sky on Swings - 2019
 Sexual Misconduct of the Middle Classes - 2020
 "Post-Democracy" - 2021

Awards and honours
Moscovitch won Dora Mavor Moore Awards for In This World (2010) and "Infinity" (2015). She won both the Trillium Book Award and Toronto Critic's Awards in 2014 for This Is War. She has won the Nova Scotia Masterworks Award for "Old Stock: A Refugee Love Story", and the SummerWorks Prize for Best Production for The Russian Play.  

She received the Windham–Campbell Literature Prize (2016) in the Drama category, becoming the first Canadian woman to win the prize. 

She was the winner of the Governor General's Award for English-language drama at the 2021 Governor General's Awards for her play Sexual Misconduct of the Middle Classes.

Award nominations received by Moscovitch include the Siminovitch Prize, the Governor General's Award, the Carol Bolt Award, the Susan Smith Blackburn Prize, the KM Hunter Award and the Toronto Arts Council Foundation Emerging Artist Award.

References

External links
 "Moscovitch is already famous" Toronto Star October 20, 2007
 "Hannah Moscovitch: Playwright revisits the production that set her career in motion" NOW Magazine January 16, 2008
 "Hannah Moscovitch: Hit factory The Globe and Mail. January 13, 2009

1978 births
Living people
Canadian women dramatists and playwrights
Canadian people of English descent
Canadian people of Irish descent
Canadian people of Romanian-Jewish descent
Canadian people of Ukrainian-Jewish descent
Dora Mavor Moore Award winners
Canadian atheists
Jewish atheists
National Theatre School of Canada alumni
University of Toronto alumni
Writers from Ottawa
21st-century Canadian dramatists and playwrights
21st-century Canadian women writers
Governor General's Award-winning dramatists